Mel Kelly (born 22 October 1972) is an Irish stand-up comedian and international speaker based in Munich since 2003.  Kelly began his speaking career in 2004, has spoken on stages in Europe, the US and Thailand. He has also won several European Speaking Contests in English and in German.

Mel is a world renowned author of two books. His first book was Born in Ireland Made in Germany and his second book is Top Tips for Dating Disasters in Germany. He also performed in a TEDx talk on Born in Ireland Made in Germany.

Kelly began his comedy career in 2014. He has founded the biggest English-German comedy club in Munich “Comedy Club Munich” and started his first comedy tour in Germany with “Die Irren on Tour” in February 2016. Mel is has been the star of a YouTube show Disastrous Dating by Mel Kelly which later rebranded as Disastrous Life Coaching by Mel Kelly.

Competitive awards 
Since 2006, Kelly has won 11 awards in competitions in two languages at district conferences of Toastmasters International:

References

1972 births
Living people
Irish male comedians
Irish stand-up comedians